Gelman is a variant spelling of Helman. Notable people with the surname include:

Alexander Gelman (born 1960), Russian-American theater director
Alexander Isaakovich Gelman (born 1933), Russian playwright
Andrew Gelman (born 1965), American statistician
Brett Gelman (born 1976) American actor and comedian
Jacques Gelman (1909–1986), Mexican film producer and art collector
Juan Gelman (1930–2014), Argentine poet
Kimiko Gelman (born 1966), American actress
Larry Gelman (1930–2021), American actor
Macarena Gelman (born 1976), Uruguayan activist, granddaughter of Juan Gelman
Maksim Gelman (born 1987), convicted spree killer in New York City
Marat Gelman (born 1960), Russian politician and art collector
Michael Gelman (born 1961), American executive producer for TV talk show Live with Kelly and Ryan
Polina Gelman (1919–2005), Soviet military pilot and World War II heroine
Rochel Gelman (born 1942), Canadian psychologist
Susan Gelman (born 1957), professor at the University of Michigan
Susie Gelman, American activist
Woody Gelman (1915–1978), American cartoonist
 Yury Gelman (born 1955), Ukrainian-born American Olympic fencing coach

See also
Estelle and Melvin Gelman Library,  main library of The George Washington University 
Gellman
Murray Gell-Mann